Sara Errani and Roberta Vinci were the defending champions, but chose not to participate this year.
Bethanie Mattek-Sands and Lucie Šafářová won the title, defeating Caroline Garcia and Katarina Srebotnik in the final, 6–4, 6–3.

Seeds

Draw

Draw

References
 Main Draw

Porsche Tennis Grand Prixandnbsp;- Doubles
2015 Doubles